The 1997 Advanta Championships was a men's tennis tournament played on indoor hard courts at the CoreStates Center in Philadelphia, Pennsylvania in the United States and was part of the Championship Series of the 1997 ATP Tour. It was the 30th edition of the tournament and was held from February 24 through March 2, 1997. First-seeded Pete Sampras won the singles title, his third at the event after 1990 and 1992, and earned $100,000 first-prize money.

Finals

Singles

 Pete Sampras defeated  Patrick Rafter 5–7, 7–6(7–4), 6–3
 It was Sampras' 3rd singles title of the year and the 47th of his career.

Doubles

 Sébastien Lareau /  Alex O'Brien defeated  Ellis Ferreira /  Patrick Galbraith 6–3, 6–3
 It was Lareau's 1st title of the year and the 4th of his career. It was O'Brien's 1st title of the year and the 4th of his career.

References

External links
 ITF tournament edition details

Advanta Championships
U.S. Pro Indoor
Advanta Championships
Advanta Championships
Advanta Championships
Advanta Championships